The National Association of Black Journalists (NABJ) is an organization of African-American journalists, students, and media professionals. Founded in 1975 in Washington, D.C., by 44 journalists, the NABJ's stated purpose is to provide quality programs and services to and advocate on behalf of black journalists. The organization has worked for diversity and to increase the number of minorities in newsrooms across the country.

The association's national office is on the main campus of the University of Maryland, College Park. The current president is Dorothy Tucker, Investigative reporter for WBBM-TV CBS Chicago, and the executive director is Drew Berry.   The NABJ states that it has a membership of 4,100 and is the largest organization of journalists of color in the United States. The organization was one of the four minority journalist member associations in the UNITY: Journalists of Color, Inc. until they seceded from the organization in Spring 2011.

The organization's annual Salute to Excellence Awards honors coverage of African-American people and subjects. Awards given include Journalist of the Year, Emerging Journalist and Lifetime Achievement; past honorees have included Lester Holt, Ed Bradley, Carole Simpson, Byron Pitts, Charlayne Hunter-Gault, Bernard Shaw, Gwen Ifill, and Michele Norris. NABJ also maintains the NABJ Hall of Fame, which is designed to honor black journalists.

History 
The founding meeting of the National Association of Black Journalists was held on December 12th, 1975 in Washington D.C. at the Sheraton Park Hotel (now the Marriott Wardman Park).  The interim committee for a National Association of Black Journalists, The Association of Black Journalists in Philadelphia, Chicago Association of Black Journalists, San Francisco Association of Black Journalists and the Washington Association of Black Journalists hosted the founding to create the National Association of Black Journalists based on the work of the Black Perspective, a 1967 group of journalists.   The National Association of Black Journalists saw fit its creation because at the time, there were associations of other professions including teachers, lawyers and doctors and believed journalists to be as important and other professions. A 1968 Kerner Commission Report mentioned how small a role black people held in a white media environment. The National Association of Black Journalists was founded to increase the presence of black people in mainstream media and change the misrepresentation of black people. The organization used the constitution of The Association of Black Journalists in Philadelphia.  Founded on Friday, December 12th, 1975, the organization explicitly stated their excitement to cover the 1976 presidential campaigns.

Founders 

 Norma Adams-Wade, Dallas Morning News
 Carole Bartel, CORE Magazine
 Edward Blackwell, Milwaukee Journal
 Reginald Bryant, Black Perspective on the News
 Maureen Bunyan, WTOP-TV (Washington, D.C.)
 Crispin Campbell, WNET-TV (New York City)
 Charlie Cobb, WHUR (Washington, D.C.)
 Marilyn Darling, WHYY-TV (Wilmington, Delaware)
 Leon Dash, Washington Post
 Joe Davidson, Philadelphia Bulletin
 Allison J. Davis, WBZ-TV (Boston)
 Paul Delaney, The New York Times
 William Dilday, WLBT-TV (Jackson, Mississippi)
 Sandra Rosen Dillard, Denver Post
 Joel Dreyfuss, Washington Post
 Sam Ford, WCCO-TV (Minneapolis)
 David Gibson, Mutual Black Network
 Sandra Gilliam-Beale, WHIO-TV (Dayton, Ohio)
 Bob Greenlee, New Haven Register
 Martha Griffin, National Public Radio
 Derwood Hall, WSOC-TV (Charlotte, North Carolina)
 Bob Hayes, San Francisco Examiner
 Toni Jones, Detroit Free Press
 Mal Johnson, Cox Broadcasting
 Vernon Jarrett, Chicago Tribune
 Claude Lewis, Philadelphia Bulletin
 H. Chuku Lee, Africa Journal Ltd.
 Sandra Dawson Long, News Journal (Wilmington, Delaware)
 Pluria Marshall, freelancer
 Acel Moore, Philadelphia Inquirer
 Luix Overbea, The Christian Science Monitor
 Les Payne, Newsday
 Alex Poinsett, Ebony
 Claudia Polley, NBC News
 Richard Rambeau, Project Bait (Detroit)
 W. Curtis Riddle, Louisville Courier-Journal
 Max Robinson, WTOP-TV (Washington, D.C.)
 Charlotte Roy, Detroit Free Press
 Vince Sanders, National Black Network
 Chuck Stone, Philadelphia Daily News
 Jeannye Thornton, U.S. News & World Report
 Francis Ward, Los Angeles Times
 John C. White, Washington Star
 DeWayne Wickham, Baltimore Sun
 Paul Brock, Founding NABJ Executive Director

Annual convention and career fair 
NABJ annually holds the nation's largest journalism convention and career fair each summer with plenary sessions and workshops for career and professional development.

Recent speakers have included former U.S. Presidents Barack Obama, George W. Bush and Bill Clinton, Liberian President Ellen Johnson Sirleaf, Hillary Clinton, and Senegalese President Abdoulaye Wade. The convention features hundreds of recruiters and as the largest career fair in journalism, is among the best means of finding a journalism position in the industry.

The NABJ Career Fair encompasses the nations broadcast, print, and online media including recruiters from Gannett Corporation, NBC News, CNN, Bloomberg, Google, ESPN, The Huffington Post, The New York Times, and Tribune Company.

NABJ held its first convention in October 1976 at Texas Southern University, which at the time had recently established the second school of communications at a historically black college or university in the nation (the first was the School of Communications at Howard University).

Future locations of the NABJ Convention and Career Fair include Washington, D.C. in 2020; Houston, Texas in 2021; Las Vegas, Nevada in 2022; Birmingham, Alabama in 2023; Chicago, Illinois in 2024; Cleveland, Ohio in 2025 and Atlanta, Georgia in 2026. 

In October 2014, CNN withdrew its support for the 2015 Convention and Career Fair after the NABJ criticized the network for its lack of diversity on air and its treatment of black employees.

Scholarships 
The organization also distributes more than $100,000 in scholarships to African-American college journalism students, places 14-16 students at paid internships and sponsors short courses for students at historically black colleges and universities.

Task forces 
 Arts & Entertainment Task Forces - members who cover arts and entertainment
 Associate Member's - part-time journalists, educators, marketing and public relations professionals
 Copy Editors - copy desk managers, news editors, design editors
 Digital Journalism 
 NABJ Founders - NABJ Founders, past presidents, and former national board members
 LGBT Taskforce - lesbian, gay, bisexual and transgender members
 Sports Task Force - sports reporters, correspondents and analysts
 Visual Task Force - photojournalists, design/informational graphics
 Young Journalists - journalists in their first few years
 World Affairs - promotes worldwide coverage of African/African-Americans

Presidents 
Twenty-one people have served as president of the National Association of Black Journalists:

Chuck Stone, 1975–77
Vernon Jarrett, 1977–79
Bob Reid, 1979–81
Les Payne, 1981–83
Merv Aubespin, 1983–85
Al Fitzpatrick, 1985–87
DeWayne Wickham, 1987–89
Thomas Morgan III, 1989–91
Sidmel Estes-Sumpter, 1991–93
Dorothy Butler Gilliam, 1993–95
Arthur Fennell, 1995–97
Vanessa Williams, 1997–99
William W. Sutton Jr., 1999–2001
Condace Pressley, 2001–03
Herbert Lowe, 2003–05
Bryan Monroe, 2005–07
Barbara Ciara, 2007–09
Kathy Y. Times, 2009–11
Gregory Lee Jr., 2011–2013
Bob Butler, 2013–2015
Sarah Glover, 2015–2019
Dorothy Tucker, 2019–present

Awards 
During its Annual Convention and Career Fair, NABJ presents various awards at the annual Salute to Excellence Awards Gala.

Journalist of the Year

1979 - Acel Moore, Philadelphia Inquirer, Les Payne, Newsday
1980
1981 - Robert C. Maynard, Oakland Tribune, Max Robinson, ABC
1982 - Gil Noble, WABC-TV, New York
1983 - Joe Ogelsby, Miami Herald
1984 - Morris Thompson, Newsday
1985 - Kenneth Walker, ABC, Dennis Bell, Newsday
1986 - Charlayne Hunter-Gault, PBS
1987 - Andrew W. Cooper, The City Sun, Brooklyn, NY
1988 - Michel du Cille, The Washington Post
1989 - Bernard Shaw, CNN
1990 - Maureen Bunyan, WUSA-TV, Washington, DC
1991 - Soledad O'Brien, CNN
1992 - Carole Simpson, Charlayne Hunter-GaultABC
1993 - Bryant Gumbel, NBC Today
1994 - Isabel Wilkerson, The New York Times
1995 - Andrea Ford, Los Angeles Times [deceased]
1996 - Ed Gordon, BET News, NBC
1997 - Gary Fields, USA Today
1998 - Clarence Williams III, Los Angeles Times
1999 - Ron Allen, NBC
2000 - Kevin Mérida, The Washington Post
2001 - Gerald Boyd, The New York Times
2002 - Byron Pitts, CBS
2003 - George Curry, NNPA
2004 - Hannah Allam (McClatchy Newspapers), Middle East Bureau Chief
2005 - Andy Alford, Austin American-Statesman
2006 - Cynthia Tucker, Atlanta Journal-Constitution
2007 - Dean Baquet, Washington Bureau Chief, The New York Times
2008 - Leonard Pitts, Miami Herald
2009 - Michele Norris, National Public Radio
2010 - Soledad O'Brien, CNN
2011 - Jacqueline Charles, Miami Herald
2012 - Pierre Thomas, ABC News
2013 - Roland S. Martin, TV One
2014 - Stephen Henderson, Detroit Free Press, for his columns on the financial crisis facing his hometown of Detroit
2015 - Nikole Hannah-Jones
2016 - Lester Holt, NBC Nightly News
2017 - April Ryan, American Urban Radio Networks
2018 - Jemele Hill, ESPN's The Undefeated

Journalist of Distinction 

 2016 - Steve Crump, WBTV
 2017 - Leoneda Inge, WUNC Radio
 2018 - Everett Marshburn, Milwaukee PBS
 2019 - Mel Showers, WKRG

Legacy Award

2005 - Acel Moore, The Philadelphia Inquirer
2006 - Lawrence E. Young, The Press Enterprise
2007 - Glenn Proctor, The Star-Ledger (Newark, N.J.)
2008 - Evelyn Cunningham, The Pittsburgh Courier
2009 - Leon Carter and Sandy Rosenbush, Sports Journalism Institute
2010 - Paula Madison, NBC Universal
2011 – Claire Smith (ESPN)
2012 - Monica Pearson, WSB-TV (Atlanta)
2013 - Theodore "Ted" Holtzclaw, WABC (New York) (Posthumous)
2014 - Hugh Grannum, photographer (posthumously), Detroit Free Press
2015 - Bryan Burwell, sports journalist (posthumously), The St. Louis Post-Dispatch
2016 - David Aldridge, Turner Sports
2017 - Ron Thomas, Director of the Journalism and Sports Program at Morehouse College
2018 - Robert McGruder, Detroit Free Press (Posthumous)

Journalism Educator of the Year

2005 - Karen Clark, Langston University
2006 - Kip Branch, Elizabeth City State University
2007 - Robert Adams & James Highland, Western Kentucky University
2008 - Nagatha Tonkins, North Carolina A&T State University
(no 2009 award given)
2010 - James Hawkins, Florida A&M University
2011 – Bonnie Newman Davis, Virginia Commonwealth University
2012 – Allissa Richardson, Morgan State University
2013 - Michelle Johnson, Boston University
2014 - Dr. Linda Florence Callahan, North Carolina A&T State University

Student Journalist of the Year

2007 - Eddie Cole, Jr., Tennessee State University
2010 - Philip Lucas, Howard University
2011 – Ashley Williams, University of Southern California
2012 - Eric Burse, USC Annenberg School of Communications
2013 - Marissa A. Evans, Marquette University
2014 - Claudia Balthazar (Hofstra University’s graduate) and Averi Harper (Columbia University graduate)
2018 - Doni Holloway, UNC Chapel Hill School of Media and Journalism

Community Service Award

1997 - Joe Madison, WRC-Radio
1998 - Gwen Tolbart, KTVT, Dallas, TX
1999 - C. Ron Allen, Fort Lauderdale Sun-Sentinel
2000 - Andrew Humphrey, WRC-TV, Washington, D.C
2001 - Angela Curry, Kansas City Star
2002 - DeWayne Wickham, USA Today, GNS
2003 - Yvonne Lewis-Harris, KTUL-TV, Channel 8
2004 - Mollie Finch Belt, The Dallas Examiner
2005 - Derek Nathaniel Ali, Dayton Daily News [posthumous]
2006 - DeMarco Morgan, WISN-TV, Milwaukee
2007 - Linda Waller Shockley, Dow Jones Newspaper Fund
2008 - Margaret Bernstein, The Cleveland Plain Dealer
 (no award given in 2009)
2010 - Michelle Singletary, Founder of First Baptist Church of Glenarden, MD
2011 – Stacey Tisdale, NBC, PBS and WowOWow.com
2012 - Albert Knighten, 107.5 FM
2013 - Dr. Shelley Stewart, The Mattie C. Stewart Foundation
2014 - Michaela Pereira, CNN

Emerging Journalist of the Year

2003 - Issac Peterson III
2004 - Theola Labbé
2005 - Krissah Williams
2006 - Errin Haines and Trymaine Lee
2007 - Mara Schiavocampo
2008 - Sarah Hoye
2010 - Michael Feeney, The Daily News in New York
2009 - Cynthia Gordy
2011 - Kimberley A. Martin, Newsday
2012 - Gerrick Kennedy, L.A. Times
2013 - Yamiche Alcindor, USA Today
2014 - Wesley Lowery, Washington Post
2015 - Brittany Noble-Jones, KMOV in St. Louis, MO
2016 - Jamiles Lartey, The Guardian
2017 - Ernest Owens, G Philly (co-winner)
2017 - Candace Smith, ABC News
2019 - Alexi McCammond

Pat Tobin Media Professional Award

2011 - Sheila Brooks, SRB Communications
2012 - Janet Rolle, CNN
2013 - Dawn Kelly, Prudential
2014 - Tiffany R. Warren, ADColor, Omnicom Groups

Chuck Stone Lifetime Achievement Award

1978 - Mal Goode, ABC News
1979 - Carl Murphy, Afro-American Newspapers
1980 - Carl Rowan, syndicated columnist
1981 - Lerone Bennett Jr., Ebony
1982 - Ethel Payne, Sengstacke Newspapers
1983 - Gordon Parks, Carlton Goodlett, San Francisco Reporter
1984 - Albert Fitzpatrick, Knight-Ridder Inc.
1985 - Lu Palmer, Chicago Sun-Times
1986 - Jimmy Hicks, Amsterdam News [posthumous]
1987 - John H. Johnson, Johnson Publishing Co.
1988 - Armistead Pride, Lincoln University
1989 - Peggy Peterman, St. Petersburg Times
1990 - Vernon Jarrett, Chicago Sun-Times
1991 - Sam Lacy, Afro-American
1992 - Chuck Stone, UNC
1993 - Luix Overbea, Christian Science Monitor
1994 - William Raspberry, Washington Post
1995 - Thomas Morgan III, The New York Times
1996 - William Brower, Toledo Blade
1997 - Samuel L. Adams, University of Kansas
1998 - Sarah-Ann Shaw, WBZ-TV, Boston
1999 - Belva Davis, KPIX-TV, San Francisco
2000 - Joseph A. Palmer Sr., Proud magazine [posthumous] and Dr. Ernest C. Withers Sr., The Withers Studio
2001 - Charles Jackson, Oakland Tribune [posthumous]
2002 - Robert McGruder, Detroit Free Press [posthumous]
2003 - Greg Freeman, St. Louis Post-Dispatch [posthumous]
2004 - Clarence Page, Chicago Tribune
2005 - Ed Bradley, CBS News
2006 - Earl G. Graves, Sr., Black Enterprise Magazine
2007 - Bernard Shaw, CNN
2008 - Harry Porterfield, WLS-TV, Chicago
2009 - Michael Wilbon, The Washington Post/ESPN
2010 - Paul Delaney, The New York Times
2011 - Acel Moore, NABJ Founder & Pulitzer Prize Winner
2012 - Les Payne, Newsday
2013 - Gregory L. Moore
2013 - DeWayne Wickham, USA Today, Morgan State University
2014 - Sandra Hughes, former anchor, WFMY-TV, Greensboro, NC
2017 - Yvette Miley, MSNBC
2018 - Beverly White, KNBC Los Angeles
2020 - Kevin Merida, ESPN

Percy Qoboza Foreign Journalist

1989 – Zwelakhe Sisulu, New Nation, South Africa [1st winner]
1993 – Ben Ephson, West Africa (magazine), Ghana
1994 – Zubeida Jaffer, Cape Town, South Africa
1995 – Kenneth Best, The Daily Observer, Liberia
1996 – Babacar Fall, Pan-African News Agency, Senegal
1997 – Marie-Roger Biloa, Africa International magazine, Paris
1998
1999 – Fred Mmembe, The Post, Zambia
2000 – Rafael Marques, Angola
2002 – Milkias Mihreteab Yohannes, Eritrea
2003 – Geoff Nyarota, The Daily News, Zimbabwe
2004 – Pius Njawé, Cameroon
2005 – Michèle Montas, Haiti
2006 – Deyda Hydara, and members of the Gambian Press Union (posthumous)
2007 – National Union of Somali Journalists
2008 – Imprisoned Journalists of Eritrea
2011 – Jean-Claude Kavumbagu, Net Press
2012 -
2013 -
2014 -

Best Practices

2006 - The Indianapolis Recorder
2007 - CNN
2009 - The Chauncey Bailey Project
2010 - NBC Universal
2011 -
2012 - TV ONE
2013 - Washington Post
2014 - Al Jazeera
2015 - Buzzfeed

Student Chapter of the Year

1997 – University of Georgia
1998 – Boston Association of Black Journalists Student Consortium
1999 – Penn State Association of Journalists for Diversity
2000 – Atlanta Association of Black Journalists Student Consortium
2001 – Carolina Association of Black Journalists
2002 – Carolina Association of Black Journalists
2003 – University of North Texas
2004 – University of Oregon
2005 – Northwestern University
2006 – Temple Association of Black Journalists
2007 – University of Georgia
2008 – Florida A&M University
2015 - Northwestern University
2016 - University of Southern California
2017 - Morgan State University
2018 - North Carolina A&T University of Black Journalists
2019 - Winthrop University Association of Black Journalists

Chapter of the Year

1996 – Garden State (New Jersey) Association of Black Journalists
1997 – Cleveland Chapter of NABJ
1998 – Richmond Association of Black Journalists
1999 – Atlanta Association of Black Journalists
2000 – Wisconsin Black Media Association
2001 – Detroit Chapter of NABJ
2002 – Houston Association of Black Journalists
2003 – San Diego Association of Black Journalists
2004 – Black Journalists Association of Southern California
2005 – Hampton Roads
2006 – Houston Association of Black Journalists
2007 – Washington Association of Black Journalists
2008 – Philadelphia Association of Black Journalists
2012 – Atlanta Association of Black  Journalists
2013 – New York Association of Black Journalists
2014 – Philadelphia Association of Black Journalists
2015 - Pittsburgh Black Media Federation & Southern New England Association of Black Journalists
2016 - Baton Rouge Area Association of Black Journalists & Greater Cleveland Association of Black Journalists
2017 - Pittsburgh Black Media Federation
2018 - Chicago 
2019 - Rochester Association of Black Journalists & San Diego Association of Black Journalists

President's Award

1993 - William A. Hilliard, The Oregonian
1994 - Nancy Hicks Maynard, Oakland Tribune
1995 - John Dotson, Akron Beacon Journal
1996 - Bob Johnson, BET
1997 - Vernon Jarrett, Chicago Sun-Times
2000 - Patsy Pressley, National Association of Black Journalists
2001 - Paula Madison, NBC
2002 - Leonard Pitts, Jr., Miami Herald
2003 - Richard Prince, The Washington Post
2004 - Don Hudson, The Clarion-Ledger
2005 - Monte Trammer, The Star-Gazette
2006 - Ryan L. Williams, National Association of Black Journalists
2007 - Rodney Brooks, USA Today
2008 - Roland Martin, CNN
2009 - Drew Berry, Drew Berry & Associates, LLC (back-to-back)
2010 - Drew Berry, Drew Berry & Associates, LLC
2011 - Johnathan A. Rodgers, TV ONE
2012 - Sarah Glover, NBC10 (Philadelphia)
2013 - Kelley L. Carter, EBONY, and Maureen Bunyan, WJLA
2014 - Carol D. Ash, Kennedy King College and Vince Hill, KYW (Philadelphia)
2015 - Veronique Dodson, National Association of Black Journalists
2016 - Elise Durham, Florida A&M University
2017 - Sheila Brooks, SRB Communications
2018 - Vickie Thomas, WWJ/CBS Radio-Detroit
2018 - Ryan L. Williams, NBC News/MSNBC
2019 - Kelley Carter, ESPN's The Undefeated

References

External links

African-American press
African-American professional organizations
American journalism organizations
Journalism-related professional associations
Organizations established in 1975
1975 establishments in Washington, D.C.

Awards honoring African Americans